The Trinity Buoy Wharf Drawing Prize is the United Kingdom's leading award in contemporary drawing.

Initially awarded in 1991 as the Malvern Open Drawing Prize, it became the Cheltenham Open Drawing Competition in 1994, and then the Jerwood Drawing Prize from 2001 until 2017. It is claimed to be the largest and longest running annual open exhibition for drawing in the UK.

Background
It was established by Malvern Drawing Associates in 1991 to promote excellence in contemporary drawing practice and moved to Cheltenham in 1994.

From 2001 until 2017 it was funded by the Jerwood Charitable Foundation and organised by Wimbledon College of Art. The exhibition is open to entry by all artists resident or domiciled in the United Kingdom. It takes place annually, and includes an exhibition of all the shortlisted drawings which then forms a touring exhibition.

The Trinity Buoy Wharf Trust, which since 1998 has used income from properties at Trinity Buoy Wharf in east London to fund arts projects, took over sponsorship of the Prize in 2018.

In 2004 approximately 2,000 entries were received. In 2011 the competition accepted approximately 3,500 entries. A first prize of £6,000 and a second prize of £3,000 were awarded. In addition there were two student awards, each with a £1,000 prize. In 2016 the first prize was £8,000 with a second prize of £5,000 and two runners up prizes of £2,000 each. In 2019, the first prize was £8,000; the runner-up received £5,000.

Winners
Previous first prize winners include:

Malvern Open Drawing Prize
 1991 – Clare Jarrett

Cheltenham Open Drawing Competition
 1994 – Sharon Beavan
 1995 – 
 1996 – Kenny Lowe
 1997 – Rebecca Salter
 1998 – Wynn Jones
 1999 – Anna Mazzotta
 2000 – David Connearn

Jerwood Drawing Prize
 2001 – Kate Davis
 2002 – Adam Dant
 2003 – Paul Brandford for Snatch
 2004 – Sarah Woodfine 
 2005 – Juliette Losq for We are the fiction of the vanished lives and buildings
 2006 – Charlotte Hodes
 2007 – Sophie Horton
 2008 – Warren Baldwin
 2009 – Mit Senoj (AKA Tim Jones)
 2010 – Virginia Verran for her drawing Bolus-Space (signal)
 2011 – Gary Lawrence for his drawing Homage to Anonymous
 2012 – Karolina Glusiec for her film Velocity
 2013 – Svetlana Fialova for her drawing Apocalypse (My Boyfriend Doesn’t Care)
 2014 – Alison Carlier for her audio work Adjectives, lines and marks
 2015 – Thomas Harrison
 2016 – Solveig Settemsdal for her video, Singularity. A "temporal and sculptural process of drawing", it was the first video to win the prize.
 2017 –  Gary Lawrence. Second Prize Ana Mendes, Evelyn Williams Drawing Award Barbara Walker, Student prize Jade Montserrat

Trinity Buoy Wharf Drawing Prize
 2018 –  Caroline Burraway, for her charcoal drawing, Eden, The Jungle Calais 2016 (2017).
 2019 –  Alice Motte-Muñoz for her drawing, Reverie.
 2020 –  M.Lohrum for her performance drawing You are It. Second prize Nancy Haslam-Chance, Student award Ayeshah Zolghadr, Working Drawing award  Ben Johnson, three Special Commendations to Frank Leuwer, James Robert Morrison, Isabel Rock. 
 2021 –  Gary Lawrence for Ye Olde Keyhole Surgery (2020). Second Prize David Haines, Student Award Gabriela Adach, Working Drawing Award Zahra Akbari Baseri, Evelyn Williams Drawing Award Roland Hicks

See also
 Jerwood Painting Prize
 List of European art awards

External Links

 Trinity Buoy Wharf Drawing Prize official site at Drawing Projects UK.

References

British art awards
Drawing
Awards established in 1991
1991 establishments in the United Kingdom